The following lists events that happened in Argentina in 2017.

Incumbents
President: Mauricio Macri
Vice President: Gabriela Michetti

Governors
Governor of Buenos Aires Province: María Eugenia Vidal 
Governor of Catamarca Province: Lucía Corpacci 
Governor of Chaco Province: Domingo Peppo 
Governor of Chubut Province: Mario Das Neves (until 3 October); Mariano Arcioni (starting 3 October)
Governor of Córdoba: Juan Schiaretti
Governor of Corrientes Province: Ricardo Colombi (until 10 December); Gustavo Valdés (starting 10 December)
Governor of Entre Ríos Province: Gustavo Bordet
Governor of Formosa Province: Gildo Insfrán
Governor of Jujuy Province: Gerardo Morales
Governor of La Pampa Province: Carlos Verna 
Governor of La Rioja Province: Ricardo Quintela
Governor of Mendoza Province: Alfredo Cornejo 
Governor of Misiones Province: Hugo Passalacqua 
Governor of Neuquén Province: Omar Gutiérrez
Governor of Río Negro Province: Alberto Weretilneck 
Governor of Salta Province: Juan Manuel Urtubey 
Governor of San Juan Province: Sergio Uñac
Governor of San Luis Province: Alberto Rodríguez Saá
Governor of Santa Cruz Province: Alicia Kirchner
Governor of Santa Fe Province: Miguel Lifschitz 
Governor of Santiago del Estero: Claudia Ledesma Abdala (until 10 December); Gerardo Zamora (starting 10 December)
Governor of Tierra del Fuego: Rosana Bertone
Governor of Tucumán: Juan Luis Manzur

Vice Governors
Vice Governor of Buenos Aires Province: Daniel Salvador 
Vice Governor of Catamarca Province: Octavio Gutiérrez (until 10 December); Jorge Solá Jais (starting 10 December)
Vice Governor of Chaco Province: Daniel Capitanich 
Vice Governor of Corrientes Province: Gustavo Canteros 
Vice Governor of Entre Rios Province: Adán Bahl 
Vice Governor of Formosa Province: Floro Bogado (until 12 December); vacant thereafter (starting 12 December)
Vice Governor of Jujuy Province: Carlos Haquim
Vice Governor of La Pampa Province: Mariano Fernández 
Vice Governor of La Rioja Province: Néstor Bosetti 
Vice Governor of Misiones Province: Oscar Herrera Ahuad 
Vice Governor of Nenquen Province: Rolando Figueroa 
Vice Governor of Rio Negro Province: Pedro Pesatti 
Vice Governor of Salta Province: Miguel Isa 
Vice Governor of San Juan Province: Marcelo Lima 
Vice Governor of San Luis Province: Carlos Ponce 
Vice Governor of Santa Cruz: Pablo González
Vice Governor of Santa Fe Province: Carlos Fascendini 
Vice Governor of Santiago del Estero: José Emilio Neder (until 10 December); Carlos Silva Neder (starting 10 December)
Vice Governor of Tierra del Fuego: Juan Carlos Arcando

Predicted and scheduled events

October
 October 22: Argentine legislative election, 2017

Unknown month
 Martín Fierro Awards ceremony

Events

January
 
 January 1: Celebrations of the New Year's Eve in Villa Gesell end in a police incident, with 15 people detained.
 January 2: The government buys four armed ships to Israel, to patrol the national borders.
 January 4
 The government proposes to reduce the age of criminal responsibility from 16 to 14 years old.
 The national chamber of criminal affairs reject a request to liberate Milagro Sala.
 Governor María Eugenia Vidal vetoes a law in the Buenos Aires Province that would have allowed people from below and above the age of consent to attend nightclubs together at cities below 30,000 residents.
 Minister Carolina Stanley undergoes medical treatment in the lungs.
 January 10: More than 2,000 manteros in the vicinity of the Once railway station are driven away by the police.
 January 11
 Mauricio Macri announces an investment plan for Vaca Muerta.
 Leonardo Meirelles, sentenced in the Operation Car Wash, reveals that he had transferred half a million dollars to Gustavo Arribas, head of the Federal Intelligence Agency of Argentina (AFI), in 2013.
 Former governor Daniel Scioli meets Pope Francis.
 January 14: It became known that the President-elect of the United States Donald Trump praised the role of Argentina in South America.
 January 15: The government proposed to limit the arrival of immigrants with a criminal record.
 January 16: A flood strikes the Santa Fe Province.
 January 19
 Javier González Fraga is appointed president of the Banco de la Nación Argentina.
 Bicentennial of the Crossing of the Andes
 January 20: A leaked audio reveals an old phone conversation between then president Cristina Kirchner and the head of the SIDE Oscar Parrilli. In the audio they discuss dummy judicial cases started against the spy Antonio Stiuso.  
 January 22: A report announces a recovery in the economy.
 January 27
 The government halts a raise in wages in the banking system of 20%, which would be above the expected inflation rate. 
 Fire at the San Nicolas Cathedral, in Rosario
 The government rejects a proposal to keep the Fútbol para todos program for six additional months.
 January 28: 250 foreign fishing ships are detected at the border of the Argentine Sea
 January 30: Jorge Olivera, at large since 2013, is recaptured.

February
 February 1: Judge Ariel Lijo open the case based on the investigations by the late Alberto Nisman.
 February 2: Retail shops start a new price system.

March
 March 1: Opening of regular sessions of the National Congress of Argentina.

October 
 October 17 – the body of missing activist Santiago Maldonado is found in the Chubut River, two and a half months after his disappearance under suspicious circumstances after Maldonado was allegedly detained by the Gendarmerie during the repression of an indigenous protest Chubut.

Deaths

 January 9: Politician José María Díaz Bancalari
 January 13: Folk singer Horacio Guarany.
 January 23: Television presenter Julieta Magaña
 April 11: Politician Alberto Balestrini

See also
List of Argentine films of 2017

References

External links
 

 
2010s in Argentina
Years of the 21st century in Argentina
Argentina